The Scottsbluff Carnegie Library is a historic building in Scottsbluff, Nebraska. It was built as a Carnegie library in 1922, and designed in the Classical Revival architectural style by architect Robert A. Bradley. A 1936 extension was designed in the same style by architect Otto John Hehnke. The building was repurposed as the West Nebraska Arts Center in 1966. It has been listed on the National Register of Historic Places since September 3, 1981.

References

National Register of Historic Places in Scotts Bluff County, Nebraska
Neoclassical architecture in Nebraska
Library buildings completed in 1922
Carnegie libraries in Nebraska